Cameraria zaira is a moth of the family Gracillariidae. It is found in the Democratic Republic of the Congo.

The forewings are elongate and the ground colour is light ochreous with white markings consisting of a basal streak and three parallel fasciae. The hindwings are pale greyish beige. Adults are on wing in early February.

Etymology
The name is derived from the word Portuguese Zaire, which is a mispronunciation of the Kikongo word nzere (meaning the river that swallows all rivers) denoting the river Congo.

References

Moths described in 2012
zaira
Insects of the Democratic Republic of the Congo
Moths of Africa
Endemic fauna of the Democratic Republic of the Congo

Taxa named by Jurate de Prins